Groenlandia is a monotypic genus of aquatic plants (pondweed) of the family Potamogetonaceae. The only species in the genus is Groenlandia densa. Opposite-leaved pondweed is a common name for this plant. It is native to much of Europe, western Asia and Maghreb in Africa; despite its name it is not found in Greenland.

References 

Freshwater plants
Potamogetonaceae
Monotypic Alismatales genera